Benjamin Franklin Hardaway (July 17, 1865 – July 9, 1955) was an officer serving in the United States Army during the Spanish–American War who received the Medal of Honor for bravery.

Biography

Hardaway was born July 17, 1865, in Benleyville, Kentucky, and, after entering the army in April 1886, worked his way up to the rank of sergeant while in Company C, 17th U.S. Infantry. On July 31, 1891, he was promoted to the rank of second lieutenant and then to first lieutenant April 26, 1898 before being sent to fight in the Spanish–American War with the 17th U.S. Infantry. While his unit was fighting at El Caney, Cuba, July 1, 1898, he received the Medal of Honor for assisting in the rescue of wounded while under heavy fire from the enemy. He received his medal on June 21, 1899. He remained in the army after the war and was promoted to the rank of captain on February 2, 1901. He retired with the rank of colonel in February 1919.

Hardaway died July 9, 1955, and was buried at Arlington National Cemetery, in Arlington, Virginia.

Medal of Honor citation
Rank and organization: First Lieutenant, 17th U.S. Infantry. Place and date: At El Caney, Cuba, 1 July 1898. Entered service at:__. Birth: Benleyville, Ky. Date of issue: 21 June 1899.

Citation
Gallantly assisted in the rescue of the wounded from in front of the lines and under heavy fire from the enemy.

See also

 List of Medal of Honor recipients for the Spanish–American War

References

External links
 

1865 births
1955 deaths
United States Army Medal of Honor recipients
United States Army colonels
American military personnel of the Spanish–American War
People from Kentucky
Burials in Ohio
Burials at Arlington National Cemetery
Spanish–American War recipients of the Medal of Honor